Veröce or Verőce may refer to 
Verőce, the Hungarian name for Virovitica, Croatia
Verőce vármegye, the Hungarian name for Virovitica County, Croatia-Slavonia
Verőce, Hungary, a village in Pest County, Hungary